The Slovak White goose (Slovak: Slovenská biela hus) is a breed of domestic goose originating in Nitra in Slovakia. The Slovak White goose is an autochthonous breed of Slovakia. 

Male Slovak White geese generally weigh around 7 kg, and females 6 kg. They lay around 14-18 eggs, which weigh 160 g.

Due to low population numbers (200 females and 100 males) the Slovak White goose is considered to be an endangered breed.

References

See also
 List of goose breeds

Goose breeds originating in Slovakia
Goose breeds